This lists autobahns, federal roads, ancient roads and scenic routes in Saxony, Germany.

Autobahns 

 Bundesautobahn 4 (A4)
 Bundesautobahn 9 (A9)
 Bundesautobahn 13 (A13)
 Bundesautobahn 14 (A14)
 Bundesautobahn 17 (A17)
 Bundesautobahn 38 (A38)
 Bundesautobahn 72 (A72)

Federal roads (Bundesstraßes) 

 Bundesstraße 2
 Bundesstraße 6 
 Bundesstraße 7
 Bundesstraße 87
 Bundesstraße 92 
 Bundesstraße 93 
 Bundesstraße 94 
 Bundesstraße 95 
 Bundesstraße 96 
 Bundesstraße 97
 Bundesstraße 98
 Bundesstraße 99
 Bundesstraße 101 
 Bundesstraße 107
 Bundesstraße 115 
 Bundesstraße 156
 Bundesstraße 169
 Bundesstraße 170
 Bundesstraße 171
 Bundesstraße 172
 Bundesstraße 172a
 Bundesstraße 172b (in planning)
 Bundesstraße 173 
 Bundesstraße 174 
 Bundesstraße 175
 Bundesstraße 176 
 Bundesstraße 177 
 Bundesstraße 178
 Bundesstraße 180 
 Bundesstraße 181 
 Bundesstraße 182 
 Bundesstraße 183
 Bundesstraße 183a 
 Bundesstraße 184 
 Bundesstraße 186
 Bundesstraße 282
 Bundesstraße 283

Ancient and Historical Roads 
 Bishop's Road (Meißen–Stolpen)
 Dresden to Teplitz Post Road
 Kulmer Steig
 Old Freiberg to Teplitz Post Road
 Salt roads (Alte Salzstraße and Böhmische Steige)
 Via Imperii
 Via Regia
 Via Regia Lusatiae Superioris (German:Hohe Straße)
 Way of St. James

Scenic routes 
Deutsche Alleenstraße
Sächsische Weinstraße
Silver Road (German:Silberstraße)
Fürstenstraße der Wettiner (under construction)

External links 
 Straßenbau in Sachsen

Transport in Saxony